James "Jim" McQuillan (born 3 December 1940) is an Irish former professional darts player who played in British Darts Organisation (BDO) events in the 1970s.

Career 
In 1974, Jim McQuillan became Ireland's first ever News of the World Darts Championship Divisional Champion, playing out of the Vine Inn, Dundalk where he represented Ireland with distinction when he defeated Tom Bafverfeldt 2–0 and was beaten 2–1 in the semifinal by eventual winner Peter Chapman in a close match, He repeated the feat in 1978 where he finished joint 5th place. McQuillan played in the 1975 World Masters, losing in the first round to Alan Evans who went on to win the tournament. He then played in the 1979 BDO World Darts Championship, defeating Murray Smith in the first round before losing in the second round to Scotland's Jocky Wilson.

In 1978, McQuillan team Republic of Ireland on the BDO Nations Cup are Seamus O'Brien and Charles Byrne.

World Championship results

BDO
 1979: 2nd Round (lost to Jocky Wilson 1–2)

External links 
 Profile and stats on Darts Database
 1975 world masters
1979 world championship

Dundalk
Irish darts players
Living people
1940 births
British Darts Organisation players
Sportspeople from County Kerry